A quickie is sexual intercourse that a couple may engage in when the time available is minimal. The quickie may arise from a spontaneous sexual desire by the parties or be a regular or planned arrangement.

Description 
Because of the limit on available time, foreplay would generally be skipped; the woman may not have enough time to lubricate naturally. In a planned encounter, the partners may dress in a manner that reduces the time needed for undressing. For example, the woman may wear a wide skirt or a front closing dress and open crotch lingerie, thongs to be pushed aside or no underwear, especially pantyhose. The man may dispense with a jacket and belt. A quickie between a heterosexual couple may generally satisfy only the man's sexual desire. 

Quickies may solve unequal sexual desire in a relationship; however, if they become the only form of sex, with only the man getting sexual satisfaction, the relationship may suffer. Author and psychologist Joel Block has suggested that the quickie is a necessary part of a relationship and suggests practical ways for both partners to enjoy the experience.

See also 
 Fling

References

Sexual acts
Sexual slang